O2 is the second studio album by American boy band O-Town. It was released by J Records on November 11, 2002 in the United States. O2 was O-Town's last album to feature Ashley Parker Angel as a member of the group.

Background
The lead single, "These Are the Days", only reached number 64 on the US Billboard Hot 100 and failed to match the success of "Liquid Dreams" or "All or Nothing". The second single, "I Showed Her", failed to chart anywhere. However, the album showed more creative input from the band, as they co-wrote six of the songs. Despite this, they soon disbanded the following year.

Critical reception
AllMusic editor found that "backed by buoyant beats and haunting melodies old, new, borrowed and blue, flavored with the usual lyrics of love and loss (many penned by members of the band), O-Town transcends the above pitfalls on an album that stands strong amidst the boy-band world."

Commercial Performance 
O2 debuted and peaked at number 28 on the US Billboard 200, selling over 52,000 copies. It eventually sold over 257,000 copies in the United States and over half a million worldwide. Elsewhere, the album entered the top 20 of the German Albums Chart, reaching number 14.

Track listing

Notes
 signifies a vocal producer
 signifies an associate vocal producer
Sample credits
"I Only Dance with You" contains elements of "Careless Whisper" as written by George Michael and Andrew Ridgeley.
"Make Her Say" contains re-sung elements from the composition "Make 'Em Say Uhh!" as performed by Master P along with Fiend, Silkk the Shocker, Mia X and Mystikal.

Charts

References

2002 albums
Albums produced by the Underdogs (production team)
J Records albums
O-Town albums